Manchester Alternative General Information Centre  (MAGIC) was an alternative society centre in Manchester, England, in the 1970s.

External links
Manchester Direct Action NWLab History
Comparing Radical Environmental Activism in Manchester, Oxford and North Wales - Keele University 

Information centres
Buildings and structures in Manchester